Higo may refer to:

 Higo Province, old province in what is now Kumamoto Prefecture, Japan
 Higo Ko-ryu, Japanese koryū martial art
 Higo Magalhães (born 1982), Brazilian football manager and former defensive midfielder
 Higo (footballer) (born 1986), Higo Seara Santos de Oliveira, Brazilian football midfielder
 Leandro Higo (born 1989), Brazilian mixed martial artist

See also
 El Higo (disambiguation)